Avenay-Val-d'Or is a commune in the Marne department, northeastern France. Located in the Vallée de la Marne, part of the Champagne region, its primary industry is viticulture.

History

A number of Roman remains have been discovered nearby, including a fort and medals showing Emperors Marcus Aurelius and his son Commodus. It was formerly the site of a Benedictine abbey founded by Bertha of Avenay at the end of the sixth century CE, later destroyed during the French Revolution. One of the most prestigious religious institutions in Champagne, it became so popular in the 12th century that limits were placed on the number of nuns accepted.

Population

See also
Communes of the Marne department
Montagne de Reims Regional Natural Park

References

Communes of Marne (department)